Trois-Rivières (formerly known as Three Rivers and Trois-Rivières Métropolitain) is an electoral district in Quebec, Canada that has been represented in the House of Commons of Canada from 1867 to 1892 and from 1935 to the present.

It was created as "Three Rivers" riding by the British North America Act of 1867. The electoral district was abolished in 1892 when it was merged into Three Rivers and St. Maurice riding.

The electoral district's English name changed in 1947 to "Trois-Rivières". The riding's name was changed again in 1972 to "Trois-Rivières Métropolitain". Trois-Rivières Métropolitain was abolished in 1976 when it was redistributed into a new "Trois-Rivières" riding and Champlain riding.

This riding lost territory to Saint-Maurice—Champlain and gained territory from Berthier—Maskinongé during the 2012 electoral redistribution.

Geography

The riding, in the Quebec region of Mauricie, consists of most of the city of Trois-Rivières, excepting the former cities of Trois-Rivières-Ouest and Pointe-du-Lac.

The neighbouring ridings are Berthier—Maskinongé, Saint-Maurice—Champlain, and Bas-Richelieu—Nicolet—Bécancour.

Demographics
(As of 2021)
 Average family income: $74,200
 Median household income: $56,800
 Unemployment:    8%
 Language: 93.3% French, 1.3% Spanish, 1.2% English, 1% Arabic
 Religion: 70.4% Christian (63.9% Catholic), 27.1% No religion, 2% Muslim
 Ethnicity: 91% White, 3.2% Black, 2% Indigenous, 1.4% Latin American, 1.2% Arab

History

Members of Parliament

This riding has elected the following Members of Parliament:

Election results

Trois-Rivières, 1979-present

Trois-Rivières Métropolitain, 1972-1979

Trois-Rivières, 1949-1972

												

						
Note: Ralliement créditiste vote is compared to Social Credit vote in the 1963 election.

Three Rivers, 1935-1949

Three Rivers, 1867-1892

Districts since 1867 that have included Trois-Rivières

The following list contains members of districts that have included Trois-Rivières, since 1867:

{| border="1" cellpadding="5" cellspacing="0" style="border-collapse: collapse border-color: #444444"
|- bgcolor="darkgray"
| 
|Name
|Assignments 
|Party
|Election 
|Popular Vote 

|Charles Boucher de NivervilleGovernment MPConservative186766%

|William McDougallGovernment MPConservative1868unopposed

|William McDougallGovernment MP (before 1873)Official Opposition MP (after 1873)Conservative1872unopposed

|William McDougallOfficial Opposition MPConservative187478%

|William McDougallGovernment MPConservative187857%

|Hector LangevinCabinet Member Conservative1878unopposed

|Hector LangevinCabinet MemberConservative1882unopposed

|Hector LangevinCabinet MemberConservative188751%

|Hector LangevinGovernment MP Cabinet Member (until 1891)Conservative1891<td>59%

|Sir Adolphe-Philippe Caron<td>Official Opposition MP<td>Conservative<td>1896<td>54%

|Jacques Bureau<td>Government MP<td>Liberal<td>1900<td>53%

|Jacques Bureau<td>Government MP<td>Liberal<td>1904<td>54%

|Jacques Bureau<td>Cabinet Member<td>Liberal<td>1907<td>unopposed

|Jacques Bureau<td>Cabinet Member<td>Liberal<td>1908<td>64%

|Jacques Bureau<td>Official Opposition MP<td>Liberal<td>1911<td>50%

|Jacques Bureau<td>Official Opposition MP<td>Liberal<td>1917<td>unopposed

|Jacques Bureau<td>Government MP<td>Liberal<td>1921<td>68%

|Jacques Bureau<td>Cabinet Member<td>Liberal<td>1922<td>unopposed

|Arthur Bettez<td>Government MP (until 1926)Official Opposition MP (after 1926)<td>Liberal<td>1925<td>56%

|Arthur Bettez<td>Government MP<td>Liberal<td>1926<td>66%

|Arthur Bettez<td>Official Opposition MP<td>Liberal<td>1930<td>57%

|Charles Bourgeois<td>Government MP<td>Conservative<td>1931<td>50%

|Wilfrid Gariépy<td>Government MP<td>Liberal<td>1935<td>30%

|Robert Ryan<td>Government MP<td>Liberal<td>1940<td>53%
}
|Wilfrid Gariépy<td>Independent MP<td>Independent<td>1945<td>32%

|Léon Balcer<td>Official Opposition MP<td>Progressive Conservative<td>1949<td>39%

|Léon Balcer<td>Official Opposition MP<td>Progressive Conservative<td>1953<td>53%

|Léon Balcer<td>Cabinet Member<td>Progressive Conservative<td>1957<td>51%

|Léon Balcer<td>Cabinet Member<td>Progressive Conservative<td>1958<td>60%

|Léon Balcer<td>Cabinet Member<td>Progressive Conservative<td>1962<td>49%

|Léon Balcer<td>Official Opposition MP<td>Progressive Conservative<td>1963<td>45%
}
|Joseph-Alfred Mongrain<td>Independent MP<td>Independent<td>1965<td>59%

|Joseph-Alfred Mongrain<td>Government MP<td>Liberal<td>1968<td>46%

|Claude Lajoie<td>Government MP<td>Liberal<td>1971<td>48%

|Claude Lajoie<td>Government MP<td>Liberal<td>1972<td>44%

|Claude Lajoie<td>Government MPParliamentary Secretary (from 1975 to 1977)<td>Liberal<td>1974<td>61%

|Claude Lajoie<td>Official Opposition MP<td>Liberal<td>1979<td>61%

|Claude Lajoie<td>Government MP<td>Liberal<td>1980<td>68%

|Pierre H. Vincent<td>Parliamentary Secretary<td>Progressive Conservative<td>1984<td>64%

|Pierre H. VincentParliamentary Secretary (until 1993) Cabinet Member (after 1993)Progressive Conservative[[1988 Canadian federal election|1988]]'''69%'''
{{Canadian party colour|CA|BQ|row}}
|[[Yves Rocheleau]]<td>[[Official Opposition]] [[Member of parliament|MP]]<td>[[Bloc Québécois]]<td>[[1993 Canadian federal election|1993]]<td>53%
{{Canadian party colour|CA|BQ|row}}
|[[Yves Rocheleau]] <td>[[Third party (politics)|Third Party]] [[Member of parliament|MP]]<td>[[Bloc Québécois]]<td>[[1997 Canadian federal election|1997]]<td>42%
{{Canadian party colour|CA|BQ|row}}
|[[Yves Rocheleau]]<td>[[Third party (politics)|Third Party]] [[Member of parliament|MP]]<td>[[Bloc Québécois]]<td>[[2000 Canadian federal election|2000]]<td>47%
{{Canadian party colour|CA|BQ|row}}
|[[Paule Brunelle]]<td>[[Third party (politics)|Third Party]] [[Member of parliament|MP]]<td>[[Bloc Québécois]]<td>[[2004 Canadian federal election|2004]]<td>57%
{{Canadian party colour|CA|BQ|row}}
|[[Paule Brunelle]]<td>[[Third party (politics)|Third Party]] [[Member of parliament|MP]]<td>[[Bloc Québécois]]<td>[[2006 Canadian federal election|2006]]<td>46%
{{Canadian party colour|CA|BQ|row}}
|[[Paule Brunelle]]<td>[[Third party (politics)|Third Party]] [[Member of parliament|MP]]<td>[[Bloc Québécois]]<td>[[2008 Canadian federal election|2008]]<td>46%
|-
|}

See also
 [[List of Canadian federal electoral districts]]
 [[Mauricie]]
 [[Past Canadian electoral districts]]

References
{{SCref|unit=fed|name=2011fed|accessdate=2011-03-07|24072}}
[http://www.elections.ca Campaign expense data from Elections Canada]
Riding history from the [[Library of Parliament]]:
[http://www2.parl.gc.ca/Sites/LOP/HFER/hfer.asp?Language=E&Search=Det&Include=Y&rid=753 Three Rivers, Quebec 1867 - 1892]
[http://www2.parl.gc.ca/Sites/LOP/HFER/hfer.asp?Language=E&Search=Det&rid=750&Include= Three Rivers, Quebec 1933 - 1947]
[http://www2.parl.gc.ca/Sites/LOP/HFER/hfer.asp?Language=E&Search=Det&rid=1268&Include= Trois-Rivières, Quebec 1947 - 1972]
[http://www2.parl.gc.ca/Sites/LOP/HFER/hfer.asp?Language=E&Search=Det&rid=754&Include= Trois-Rivières Métropolitain 1972 - 1976]
[http://www2.parl.gc.ca/Sites/LOP/HFER/hfer.asp?Language=E&Search=Det&rid=752&Include= Trois-Rivières, Quebec 1976 - 2008]
[http://enr.elections.ca/ElectoralDistricts_e.aspx?type=3&criteria=Trois-Rivieres 2011 Results from Elections Canada]

Notes
{{reflist}}

{{Ridings in Central Quebec}}
{{Ridings in Quebec}}

{{coord |46.359|N|72.608|W|display=title}}

{{DEFAULTSORT:Trois-Rivieres (electoral district)}}
[[Category:Politics of Trois-Rivières]]
[[Category:Quebec federal electoral districts]]